Anne Young may refer to:

Anne B. Young, American physician and neurologist
Ann Eliza Young (1844–1917), polygamist
Anne Sewell Young (1871–1961), American astronomer
Anne Young (academic), professor of biomaterials
Anne Young (nurse), Irish nurse
Ann(e) Young, married name Anne Gunn (1756 –  1813), Scottish music teacher and inventor

See also